This is a list of fighter aces in World War II from Belgium. For other countries, see: List of World War II aces by country.

B

D

H

L

M

O

P

V

References 

Belgium
Aces
World War II Aces
World War II Aces
 
Belgian World War II flying aces